Continental Miss Philippines America is an annual beauty pageant held in Los Angeles, California.  It selects both the Filipino-American representative and Miss World Philippines contestants, which then leads to Miss World, one of the Big Four international beauty pageants. Winning candidates from Continental Miss Philippines America are sent automatically and bypass screening requirements. Their tagline is "the premier Filipino-American preliminary pageant to the most prestigious pageants in the Philippines".

The pageant also selects several other representatives to participate in minor international pageants in the Miss, Teen, & Mister Category. In addition, the organizer of the pageant also holds Continental Mr. World Philippines USA. National Director Nate Calima was considered the face of Continental and was responsible for creating an international network for candidates to be sent to.

The Pageant Chairman is Jo Verte, and the National Director was Nate Calima. Filipino-American Hollywood Actor and Miss World Philippines 2019 Judge Sean Michael Afable was proclaimed Representative Director of Philippines as of 2020.

On an Instagram livestream, Sean Afable stated that he and Nate Calima are no longer part of the organization. It is unclear who has replaced them.

Continental Miss Philippines America 2018 

In 2018, three candidates were sent to Miss World Philippines from Continental Miss Philippines America: Kimilei Mugford, Cleopatra Jones, and Crystal Freedman.   Kimilei Mugford was crowned Miss Multinational Philippines at Miss World Philippines 2018 and gave Continental its first major title wins in its first year of inception.  Kimilei Mugford advanced to the Miss Multinational Pageant in India where she won Miss Multinational Asia & Oceana  Post pageantry, Kimilei Mugford was included in the movie "Go! La Union" by ALV Films  owned by Arnold L. Vegafria. Arnold L. Vegafria is also the incumbent National Director of Miss World Philippines.

Continental Miss Philippines America 2019 

Nate Calima was appointed as National Director and a major sponsor in 2019. He was responsible for field operations, public relations, and coordination with Arnold "Mama Ru" Mercado (General Manager of Miss World Philippines)

Continental Miss Philippines America was held on July 20, 2019, at the Aratani Theater in Little Tokyo, Downtown Los Angeles.  The hosts for this event were National Director Nate Calima and Miss Asia USA 2012 Christine Kan. Hosts for the Talent & Top Model was Sean Michael Afable and Miss Multinational Philippines America 2018 Erica Rose Madlangsakay. Poise, personality and Passarella training for 2019 was conducted by Bb Pilipinas International 2015 Janicel Lubina.

Erica Rose Madlangsakay (Miss Multinational Philippines America 2018), Jena Masero (Reina Hispanoamericana Filipinas 2019), Kalea Pitel (Miss Eco Philippines America 2019), & Michelle Thorlund (Miss Multinational Philippines America 2019) was sent to Miss World Philippines 2019. Their official candidate numbers are #8 Kalea Pitel, #26 Michelle Thorlund, #32 Jena Masero, & #39 Erica Rose Madlangsakay. Kalea Pitel achieved Top 22, and Michelle Thorlund was Top 12 at Miss World Philippines 2019 

Daumier Corella originally was to be sent to Mr. World Philippines 2020 but opted to go to GLAM (Global Asian Models) instead because of the time gap. He was awarded Mr. Manhunt Philippines and he credits his start at Continental Mr. World Philippines USA  

Alexandra Mae Dalumpines was sent by the organization to the inaugural presentation of Philippine Global Queens. She won Miss Continents Philippines.

Continental Miss Philippines America 2020 
Continental Miss Philippines America 2020 was postponed to Spring of 2021 due to the restrictions created by COVID19 pandemic as released by National Director Nate Calima. Sean Michael Afable moved to the Philippines and has been elevated to Representative Director (Philippines) of Continental. He will be responsible for coordinating with Nate Calima in candidates that are sent there.

Continental Miss Philippines America 2021 

Continental Miss Philippines America 2021 was held in Spring 2021. The hosts were National Director Nate Calima & Miss Eco Philippines USA and Miss World Philippines Top 22 Kalea Pitel. National Director Nate Calima stated on his social media that they had the option to send to 6+ Miss pageants. They have expanded their network of Mister pageants and new for 2021, Teen candidates were sent to compete in the Philippines and Europe. The categories were Teen 13 - 17, Miss 18 - 26, Ms., Mrs., & Mister.

Reference section 

Beauty pageants in the United States